The class MT was a class of diesel-electric locomotives of the Danish State Railways (DSB). Built by Danish manufacturer Frichs, the locomotives entered service in 1958–1960. They were primarily used for heavy shunting and branch line trains. A total of 17 units were built, numbered 151–167.

The original Frichs V8 diesel engines proved unreliable, and the locomotives were rebuilt with Maybach-Mercedes V12 engines during 1969–1971.

The first class MT unit was retired in 1990 after a shunting accident, though the remaining locomotives were not retired from DSB service until 1997–2000. MT 166 remained in use as a service locomotive (tjenestelokomotiv) until 2006.

References

Bibliography

External links 

 DSB litra MT at jernbanen.dk

MT
Frichs locomotives
Bo′Bo′ locomotives
Railway locomotives introduced in 1958
Diesel locomotives of Denmark
Standard gauge locomotives of Denmark